Wrestling Dontaku 2011 was a professional wrestling pay-per-view (PPV) event promoted by New Japan Pro-Wrestling (NJPW). The event took place on May 3, 2011, in Fukuoka, Fukuoka, at the Fukuoka Kokusai Center. The event featured 10 matches, 4 of which were contested for championships. It was the eighth event under the Wrestling Dontaku name.

Storylines
Wrestling Dontaku 2011 featured ten professional wrestling matches that involved different wrestlers from pre-existing scripted feuds and storylines. Wrestlers portrayed villains, heroes, or less distinguishable characters in the scripted events that built tension and culminated in a wrestling match or series of matches.

Event
Jyushin Thunder Liger continued his reign as the CMLL World Middleweight Champion, which had started at the previous year's Wrestling Dontaku, by defeating Consejo Mundial de Lucha Libre (CMLL) wrestler Máscara Dorada. Both IWGP tag team titles were successfully defended during the event, with Junior Heavyweight Champions Apollo 55 (Prince Devitt and Ryusuke Taguchi) defeating the No Remorse Corps (Davey Richards and Rocky Romero) and Heavyweight Champions Bad Intentions (Giant Bernard and Karl Anderson) defeating No Limit (Tetsuya Naito and Yujiro Takahashi). The event also featured two major storyline developments. In the first, following No Limit's failure to recapture the IWGP Tag Team Championship, Yujiro Takahashi walked out on Tetsuya Naito, which later led to a bitter feud between the two. In the second, Taichi and Taka Michinoku turned on Satoshi Kojima, after his loss against Togi Makabe, and formed Suzuki-gun under the leadership of Minoru Suzuki, who made his surprise return to confront Makabe. The event also marked the return of Hirooki Goto, who had spent the past two months in CMLL. In the main event, Hiroshi Tanahashi successfully defended the IWGP Heavyweight Championship against Shinsuke Nakamura, after which he was attacked by Goto, who was now displaying a new mean streak.

Results

References

External links
The official New Japan Pro-Wrestling website

2011
2011 in professional wrestling
May 2011 events in Japan